Glen Moir  is a subdivision in Bedford, Nova Scotia, Canada within the Halifax Regional Municipality, located between the Highway 102 in the west, Bedford Highway (Trunk 2) in the east, Meadowbook Dr in the North and the Hammonds Plains Road in the South.

References

Communities in Halifax, Nova Scotia